Michelbouch is a village in the commune of Vichten, in central Luxembourg.  , the village has a population of 108.

Vichten
Villages in Luxembourg